Then Comes the Sun is the third album by Italian singer-songwriter Elisa released by Sugar on 9 November 2001. It was produced by Corrado Rustici and went double platinum in Italy with over 280.000 copies sold.

The first single from the album was the promotional single "Heaven Out of Hell", in the music video Elisa appears nude.

The second single released from the album was "Rainbow", The song debuted at #5 in the Italian Singles Chart. The latest singles released were "Time" and  the promotional single "Dancing".

In 2007 Then Comes the Sun was appreciated in the United States and Canada after the song "Dancing" was used in the choreography of a routine on the TV show, So You Think You Can Dance.

Track listing

Chart performance

References

2001 albums
Elisa (Italian singer) albums